Priyantha Colombage (born in 1966) is a Sri Lankan film director and screenwriter who works primarily in Sinhala cinema. He is best known for his directorial debut “Dehena”(Trance) in 1998 & Dehena won the highest number of awards for Sri Lanka and represented the country at the Tokyo International Film Festival. His second film “Vimukthi”(Salvation) was the unanimous choice of local film critics to represent Sri Lanka at the Kerala, Milwelly and Cairo International Film Festivals.

Career
Born in Colombo, International award-winning film director Priyantha Colombage, before his passionate obsession with film, actually started out as a journalist and photographer for the reputed Sinhalese newspaper Ravaya.

A keen eye for storytelling led to his directorial debut Dehena (Trance), with which he set a new record in Sri Lankan cinema to become the youngest film director in the country at the mere age of nineteen. In 1998, Dehena won the highest number of co-awards for Sri Lanka and represented Sri Lanka at the Tokyo International Film Festival.

His second film Vimukthi (Salvation) was the unanimous choice of local film critiques to represent Sri Lanka at the Kerala, Milwelly and Cairo International Film Festivals. Arumosam Vehi (Fancy Rains), the third production to date, was financed by the National Film Corporation and went on to win the award for excellence at the 2007 China International Children's Film Festival.

Owing to the success enjoyed at the local marquee and the commercial potential in TV and video production, Priyantha launched Creative Force, his own production house, that quickly gained the patronage of top advertising agencies for the making of TV commercials, documentaries and corporate videos.

To date, he's had the distinction to execute the direction of a variety of commercials, most of them for prestigious brands like Unilever, Nestle, Elephant House, Holcim Lanka, Ceylinco VIP, Lion Breweries, Raigam, Sunlight and Ewis. Engaging documentaries have also been shot for Sri Lanka Air Force 50th Anniversary, Eppawela Phosphate, Holcim Geocycle and Holcim Safety to name a few.

Not one to rest on his laurels, Priyantha has also been responsible for producing a number of TV Programmes. Kekulu Yaya a 65 episode educational programme for children. Yarns Bar – a comedy show in addition to Deyyange Horawa, Aluth Sithuwam, Surf X-Force and the extremely popular, political satire muppet show Jabos Lane as well as a number of teledramas. And also he produced, written and directed the Sakuge Kathawa teledrama which telecasted on Swarnavahini.

Filmography

References

External links

1979 births
Living people
Sri Lankan screenwriters
People from Colombo